Muhammad Usman Diplai, popularly known as Diplai (13 June 1908 – 8 February 1981), was a figure of Sindhi literature and journalism. 

He was awarded the Pride of Performance for literature by the President of Pakistan General Pervez Musharraf on 23 March 2004.

Early life and literary career
Muhammad Usman Diplai was born at Diplo, (Tharparkar District) to Mohammad Ali Diplai, in a middle-class family. As per family traditions, he had to engage himself in business. Due to unfavourable circumstances, however, he could not complete his formal education. In early life, he worked with some landlords (zamindars) of the area as a clerk, but continued reading newspapers and magazines. He also acquired proficiency in Gujarati, Hindi, Gurmukhi, Urdu languages and a working knowledge in English and Persian. His works included a translation of the Quran in the Sindhi language.

He founded Islamia Press, Quran Press and the Islami Dar-ul-Ishaat, the Adar-i-Insanyat, and the Diplai Academy one after another shortly before the Second World War, at the historic town of Mirpurkhas, and then moved to Hyderabad in 1942 where he founded the monthly magazine Ibrat, which he sold in 1946, it then changed to publishing weekly and eventually daily. He was an essayist, journalist, publisher, distributor, and printer of the Sindhi language.

In 1923, he came across an issue of the Urdu weekly Munadi, published in Delhi by Khwaja [[Hassan Nizami) which carried an article about the conquest of Sindh by the young warrior Muhammad Bin Qasim. Diplai wrote a letter in Urdu to the editor pinpointing certain historical inaccuracies in the write-up. Hassan Nizami was so much impressed by the letter that he published it as an article. It proved a source of inspiration to Diplai and he started contributing to Munadi and Deen-o-Duniya (Urdu) journals regularly. Later, his Sindhi stories appeared in Sindhi monthlies such as Taraqqi (magazine) and Ilmi Dunya.

Awards and recognition
Pride of Performance Award (posthumously awarded) by the President of Pakistan for Literature in 2004

Death and legacy
Muhammad Usman Diplai died on 8 February 1981 at age 72.

On the 31st death anniversary of Muhammad Usman Diplai in 2012, many eminent scholars, writers and intellectuals paid tributes to him at an event held at Sindhi Language Authority auditorium including Rasool Bux Palijo who said that Diplai struggled for the promotion of education when Sindh was in the stranglehold of feudal lords and pirs. He added that Diplai had shown the way to modern education when Sindh was in desperate need for it.

Another scholar Fahmida Hussain noted that Diplai was among the few persons in the 20th century to bring about meaningful reforms in the field of education.

Bibliography
Qazi, Surriya Nasim, Muhammad Usman Diplai-His Personality and Impact of His Writings on the Social, Political and Literary Conditions of Sindh (2002, University of Sindh)

References

External links

Pakistani Sindhologists
1908 births
1981 deaths
People from Tharparkar District
Sindhi-language writers
Pakistani novelists
Pakistani translators
Pakistani male short story writers
Pakistani short story writers
Pakistani newspaper editors
Recipients of the Pride of Performance
20th-century translators